FC Tuggen is a Swiss football club from the town of Tuggen in Canton Schwyz, the German-speaking region of Switzerland. The club was founded in 1966 and currently plays in 1. Liga Promotion, the third highest tier in the Swiss football pyramid.

History

The club was founded on 11 November 1966 as SC Tuggen. In 1976 the club changed its name to FC Tuggen. In 1991, the club reached the quarter-finals of the Swiss Cup, losing 4–0 to FC Chiasso.

Stadium
Tuggen play its home games in the stadium Linthstrasse. The capacity is 2,800 spectators, with 300 seats and 2,500 standing places.

Current squad
As of 1 November, 2021.

Staff
 Adrian Allenspach – Head Coach
 Remo Löffel – Assistant Coach
 Adrian Bernet – Goalkeeper Coach
 Katharina Meyer – Masseur
 Reto Bartholet – Masseur

External links
Official Website 
Soccerway.com profile 
Football.ch profile 
sporfotos profile 

Tuggen
Association football clubs established in 1966
1966 establishments in Switzerland
Tuggen